Sir Hugh Lansdown Stephenson  (8 April 1871 – 6 September 1941) served as the Governor of Bihar and Orissa from 7 April 1927 to 7 April 1932 and the Governor of the British Crown Colony of Burma from December 1932 to May 1936.

Biography 
Educated at Westminster School and Christ Church, Oxford, Stephenson joined the Indian Civil Service in 1895.

He was appointed CIE in 1913, CSI in 1919, KCIE in 1924, KCSI in 1927, and GCIE in 1936.

References

External links
 Myanmar (Burma) at www.worldstatesmen.org
Archives relating to Sir Hugh Lansdown Stephenson at The National Archives

1871 births
1941 deaths
Knights Grand Commander of the Order of the Indian Empire
Knights Commander of the Order of the Star of India
Administrators in British Burma
People educated at Westminster School, London
Alumni of Christ Church, Oxford
Indian Civil Service (British India) officers